Geboers is a surname. Notable people with the surname include:

Eric Geboers (1962–2018), Belgian motocross racer and racing driver
Sylvain Geboers (born 1945), Belgian motocross racer and current motocross team manager